Samii (also Romanized as Samī‘ī; also known as Samī‘ā and Samīyeh) is a village in Shabankareh Rural District, Shabankareh District, Dashtestan County, Bushehr Province, Iran. At the 2006 census, its population was 276, in 49 families.

References 

Populated places in Dashtestan County